Lewis Simon Scott (born June 6, 1943) is a former American football defensive back who played one season for the Denver Broncos. He played quarterback and wide receiver in college.

Early life and education
Lew Scott was born on June 6, 1943, in Bryn Mawr, Pennsylvania. He went to high school at West Conshohocken High School and at Upper Merion Area High School. While at Upper Merion, he was a standout in football and track, and won the State Championship in the 440 and 880. He went to college at Mesa Junior College. He was there from 1962 to 1963 before transferring to Oregon State. While he was at Mesa Junior college, he was a quarterback. When he was at Oregon State, he was a defensive back and receiver. In 1965, he had 6 catches for 77 yards.

Professional career

Denver Broncos
He signed with the Denver Broncos in 1966. He played in 13 games; mostly on special teams as a return specialist.
 He had 7 punt returns for 56 yards and 9 kick returns for 282 yards. His longest return was a 77-yard kick return against the Kansas City Chiefs.

Later life
After his sports career he worked for Weyerhaeuser Lumber, Peace Corps, Sloan Program, Nuclear Regulatory Commission, and Xerox. He was inducted into the Pennsylvania Sports Hall of Fame Montgomery County Chapter on September 30, 2016, at the Valley Forge Casino Resort. The day before he had his number retired at Upper Merion High School. His brother, Clarence Scott, also received those honors.

References

1943 births
Living people
Denver Broncos players
Oregon State Beavers football players
American football defensive backs